Orient Overseas Container Line, commonly known as OOCL, is a container shipping and logistics service company with headquarters in Hong Kong. The company is incorporated in Hong Kong as Orient Overseas Container Line Limited and separately incorporated as Orient Overseas Container Line Inc. in Liberia. The latter was also re-domiciled to the Marshall Islands.

Overview
OOCL is a large integrated international container transportation, logistics and terminal company with offices in 70 countries.

OOCL is a member of the Grand Alliance formed in 1998. Its founder members are Hapag-Lloyd (Germany), NYK (Japan) and OOCL (Hong Kong).

History

OOCL was founded by C. Y. Tung in 1947 as the Orient Overseas Line. In 1969, OOL was the first Asian -based shipping line to transport containerized cargo across the Pacific. Consequently, the company was renamed Orient Overseas Container Line. In those days its Victory-class vessels could carry 300 TEU, a far cry from today's post-Panamax vessels. In April 2003, OOCL took delivery of the SX-Class OOCL Shenzhen, then the largest containership ever built at 8,063 TEU. In 2006, it lost its title to the  Emma Mærsk.  At its peak, OOCL had a fleet of over 150 freight ships, with a cargo capacity exceeding 10 million tons; it was one of the world's top seven shipping lines. At one stage it owned the Seawise Giant, the largest ship ever built, having bought it from the shipyard when the previous owners refused delivery.

After C. Y. Tung's death in 1982, C. H. Tung, assumed the leadership of Orient Overseas (International) Limited (OOIL), OOCL's parent company for 14 years.

The company declared bankruptcy in the mid-1980s and the mainland-based Bank of China provided $50 million of the $120 million put together by Henry Fok Another big contributor to the OOCL bailout was China Merchants, a Hong Kong arm of China's transport ministry.

In 1996, C. C. Tung took over at the helm on his brother C. H. Tung's election as Chief Executive of the Hong Kong Special Administrative Region.

OOCL briefly operated passenger ships acquiring the Ruahine, Rangitoto and Rangitane from the New Zealand Shipping Company that were renamed Oriental Rio, Oriental Carnival and Oriental Esmeralda to operate round the world services. The service ceased in 1976.

In September 1970, Tung purchased the ocean liner  to convert it into a floating university, to be known as Seawise University, as part of the World Campus Afloat programme. On 9 January 1972, the ship caught fire during refurbishing and sank in Hong Kong's Victoria Harbour and the wreckage had to be scrapped three years later.

In 2003, OOCL lost one of its senior executives, Courtenay Allan, the company's Transatlantic Trade Director. Allan died after falling down a lift shaft on the OOCL Montreal in Le Havre.

In recent years, OOCL has taken over a number of well-known shipping lines. These include Furness Withy, Houlder Brothers, Manchester Liners, Shaw Savill, PSNC, Prince Line & the Alexander Shipping Company.

In 2015, OOCL ordered six of the largest container ships, holding up to 20,150 TEU each. The first of these, the OOCL Hong Kong, was christened on 12 May 2017. The ship became the world's first container ship to exceed 21,000 TEU mark and achieved a Guinness World Record.

In July 2017, the parent company, OOIL, received a US$6.3 billion take over bid from its Chinese rival, COSCO Shipping. The bid has been accepted subject to shareholder and regulatory approval. The takeover was completed in 2018.

In 2018, COSCO SHIPPING Holdings acquired Hong Kong-based OOIL, the parent of OOCL, for US$6.3 billion

On July 25, 2019, OOCL Hong Kong, the lead ship of the six G-class units and once the world’s largest container ship, visited Hong Kong to mark the 50th anniversary of Orient Overseas Container Line (OOCL).

Liner Services
OOCL offers around 78 weekly services around the world. Linking Asia, Europe, North America, the Mediterranean, the Indian sub-continent, the Middle East, Australia and New Zealand.

Container Terminals
OOCL affiliated companies own or operate dedicated container terminals in North America and Asia, namely: Long Beach Container Terminal in California and KAOCT in Kaohsiung, Taiwan.

Information technology
Beginning in 1993, the group adopted the Integrated Regional Information System (IRIS-2), specifically designed for the container shipping industry. IRIS-2 integrates the business processes of all OOCL offices, customers' shipments and financial information into one system. OOCL was a finalist for the Smithsonian Institution Award for Innovation in 1999 for its achievements with IRIS-2. The program is written in GemStone/S Smalltalk, making it one of the largest Smalltalk applications in the world.

On 24 April 2018, OOCL announced an agreement with Microsoft Research Asia (MSRA) to investigate the potential of Artificial Intelligence to improve network operations and efficiencies for the shipping industry.

Environmental Considerations
OOCL was the first container shipping line to have achieved the Safety, Quality and Environmental (SQE) Management System certification (which consolidates the ISM-Code, ISO9001.2000 and ISO14001 requirements)

In 1992, five years in advance of the Montreal Protocol, an international treaty designed to protect the Earth's ozone layer, OOCL changed the design of its refrigerated container machinery in order to eliminate the use of CFCs.

OOCL maintained a 100 percent compliance with the Port of Long Beach Green Flag program in 2006 and 2007. OOCL donated its rebates, totaling US$140,000, back to community projects and charities in Long Beach. From 1 January 2006, OOCL stopped using pre-1989 trucks for all port moves between Southern Californian terminals and off-dock rail ramps, helping to reduce emissions as part of the Port's "Clean Truck Program" It also complies with the Qualship 21 program, which identifies quality operation of non-US-flagged vessels.

OOCL has had a fuel saving program in place since 2001, to cut down on greenhouse gases. Initiatives to minimize fuel consumption include:
Weather-routing systems to provide shorter routes safely
Optimum trim (balance of cargo) and minimum ballast water
Fuel injection and exhaust valve timing control for better efficiency
Shaft generator and exhaust gas economizer for generating electricity
Regular maintenance to keep the ship clean and free of marine growths such as barnacles, algae and mollusks. This maintenance includes polishing the propeller and hull, and monitoring engine performance.

OOCL conducted a Shore Power Study (in 2003) and a Sea Water Scrubber Study (in 2005) in order to identify different ways to reduce emissions, both in port and at sea.

Community Responsibility

The "Tung OOCL Scholarship" was set up in 1995 to support the continued education of young people. Currently, the Tung OOCL Scholarship comprises two programs: University Scholarship Program (China) and Employee's Children Scholarship Program. The University Scholarships have been established in six universities. They are Tsinghua University, Peking University, Fudan University, Shanghai Jiaotong University, Zhejiang University and Nanjing University. Since the establishment of the scholarship more than 2,500 undergraduate and post-graduate students have been awarded scholarships with more than US$2.3 million in funding. Every year, a selection panel is set up in each university to shortlist potential candidates, based on academic results and performance, plus active participation in extracurricular activities. Based on the same selection criteria, the Employees' Children Scholarship is awarded annually to the children of employees in all OOCL offices.

OOCL also participates in many other types of community support. One of the major and on-going projects is Project HOPE (Health Opportunities for People Everywhere). OOCL is assisting with the transportation of the latest diagnostic medical equipment and supplies from the United States (donated by global corporations) to Shanghai Children's Hospital, China.

OOCL sponsors many musicals and shows visiting the Asia-Pacific region, including Cats, Phantom of the Opera, We Will Rock You, Swan Lake on Ice, Musical Moments and Chitty Chitty Bang Bang.

Security

OOCL participates in The Customs-Trade Partnership Against Terrorism program (C-TPAT), which is a voluntary government-business initiative to build cooperative relationships that strengthen and improve overall international supply chain and U.S. border security.

OOCL also complies with the International Ship and Port Facility Security Code (ISPS Code). The ISPS Code states that, as threat increases, the only logical counteraction is to reduce vulnerability. Subsequently, ships will be subject to a system of survey, verification, certification, and control to ensure that their security measures are implemented. This system will be based on a considerably expanded control system as stipulated in the 1974 Convention for Safety of Life at Sea (SOLAS). The company also complies with the Container Security Initiative (CSI) and the US Customs 24-Hour Advance Cargo Manifest Declaration Rule.

OOCL Logistics
OOCL Logistics Ltd. (OLL), the OOIL Group's international freight consolidation and logistics service unit, began in 1979. Services extend from basic freight consolidation services to the management and operation of more comprehensive programs involving multi-modal transportation, warehousing and distribution activities.

Fleet

Accidents and incidents

OOCL Finland 
On 14 April 2011, the container ship OOCL Finland was involved in a collision in dense fog with the Russian cargo ship Tyumen-2 on the Kiel Canal near Fischerhuette, Germany. Two members of the bridge team of Tyumen-2 were killed and three were injured as a result of the collision, which damaged both vessels.

OOCL Durban 
On 3 June 2021, a tower crane collapsed at Kaohsiung port, Taiwan, as a result of the container ship OOCL Durban colliding with a stationary vessel. The incident caused serious damage to the dockside gantry crane, damaging 30 to 50 containers. One dock worker sustained minor injuries, and two engineers were temporarily trapped inside the crane.

See also

Tung Chao-yung
Seawise Giant
Orient Overseas (International) Limited
Furness Withy
Houlder Brothers
Shaw Savill
Pacific Steam Navigation Company
Manchester Liners
 Top intermodal container companies list

References

External links

OOCL official website
History of OOCL
OOIL Group
OOCL Logistics
Grand Alliance Service Center

Shipping companies of Hong Kong
Container shipping companies
Transport companies established in 1969
1969 establishments in Hong Kong
Hong Kong brands
COSCO Shipping